Boztepe is both a village and a nearby hill in Ordu Province of Turkey. There is a restaurant at the top with views over the city of Ordu and the Black Sea. In June 2012, an aerial lift system entered in service providing an easy way of transportation between the city's coastline and the hilltop. The Ordu Boztepe Gondola can transport 900 passengers hourly up to the hilltop in 6.5 minutes.

References

External links
 

Ordu
Geography of Ordu Province
Villages in Ordu Province